Kim Vincent Fowley (July 21, 1939 – January 15, 2015) was the American record producer, songwriter and musician who was behind a string of novelty and cult pop rock singles in the 1960s, and managed The Runaways in the 1970s. He has been described as "one of the most colorful characters in the annals of rock & roll", as well as "a shadowy cult figure well outside the margins of the mainstream".

Early life
Born in Los Angeles, California, Fowley was the son of character actor Douglas Fowley and actress Shelby Payne. His parents later divorced and Payne married William Friml, son of composer Rudolf Friml. Fowley attended University High School at the same time as singers Jan Berry and Dean Torrence (later of Jan and Dean fame), Bruce Johnston (later of the Beach Boys), and Nancy Sinatra, as well as actors Ryan O'Neal, James Brolin, and Sandra Dee.

Career
In 1957, he was hospitalized with polio and, on his release, became manager and publicist for local band the Sleepwalkers that included Johnston, drummer Sandy Nelson and, occasionally, Phil Spector. He spent some time in the armed forces and, by his own account, worked in the sex industry in Los Angeles in the late 1950s. In 1959 he began working in the music industry in various capacities for both Alan Freed and Berry Gordy. His first record as producer was "Charge" by the Renegades, a group comprising Johnston, Nelson, Nik Venet and Richard Podolor. He promoted records for the duo Skip & Flip (Skip Battin and Gary S. Paxton) including the #11 hit "Cherry Pie".

1960s
During the early 1960s, Fowley was involved as co-producer/co-publisher with a string of successful records produced in Los Angeles. With Gary S. Paxton he recorded the novelty song "Alley Oop", which reached # 1 on the charts in 1960 and was credited to the non-existent group the Hollywood Argyles. In 1961 he co-produced the instrumental "Like, Long Hair", arranged by Paxton, which became a #38 hit for Paul Revere and the Raiders. He arranged "Nut Rocker" for B. Bumble and the Stingers, which became a # 1 hit in the UK in 1962 and talent scouted "Papa-Oom-Mow-Mow", a #48 hit for the Rivingtons. The following year he produced "Popsicles and Icicles" by The Murmaids, which reached #3 in the charts in 1963 and which was written by a pre-Bread David Gates, then a session musician and songwriter who had met Fowley while Kim was hitchhiking in Los Angeles.

During the mid-1960s, Fowley publicized/consulted singer P.J. Proby and relocated for a time to London, England. Fowley wrote the lyrics for the song "Portobello Road", the B-side of Cat Stevens' first single, "I Love My Dog". He produced a Them spin-off band led by two ex-Them members, brothers Pat and Jackie McAuley (who were only allowed to use the band name Other Them in the UK, but called themselves Them on the European continent, releasing an album called Them Belfast Gypsies and a single "Let's Freak Out" under the name Freaks of Nature); an early incarnation of Slade known as the N'Betweens; Soft Machine (he produced "Love Makes Sweet Music", their first single); and the Lancasters, an instrumental rock group featuring a young Ritchie Blackmore. He worked with an up-and-coming band, the Farinas, and renamed them "Family".

In London around 1967 Fowley collaborated with The Seekers guitarist/arranger Keith Potger. Together (with Potger writing under the nom de plume John Martin) they wrote the lyrics to "Emerald City". Potger has said the song was originally quite unlike the eventual Seekers single, and that he heavily "Seeker-ized" the arrangement before presenting it to the group. The tune was based on the "Ode To Joy" theme from Beethoven's ninth ("Choral") symphony.

Fowley worked on occasion as a recording artist in the 1960s, issuing albums such as Love Is Alive and Well. In 1965, he wrote and produced a song about the psychedelic experience, "The Trip". In 1966 Fowley and Gail Sloatman (later Gail Zappa) recorded a spoken word single as "Bunny and Bear". The record is a satire of Sonny and Cher.

He was credited for "hypophone" on the Mothers of Invention's first album Freak Out! When asked about this band leader Frank Zappa later said "The hypophone is his mouth, 'cause all that ever comes out of it is hype."  Other singles by Fowley as a recording artist included "Animal Man", during the song he remarks "Its too dirty, it'll be banned" from his popular 1968 album Outrageous.  All his efforts as a solo artist since 1970 have become cult items, both in reissue and bootleg formats.

In 1968, Fowley joined forces with a young band from Topanga Canyon California, St John Green, to produce their only album containing songs, musical soundtracks, comedy and dark poetry.  The band members were: Ed Bissot (bass), Bill Kirkland (guitars), Vic Sabino (vocals, harmonica and percussion), Michael 'Papabax' Baxter (keyboards, arranger), and Shelly Scott (drums). The album was engineered by Michael Lloyd. Fowley later claimed it to be "one of the great lost records...Somebody will reissue it someday and people will start crying and jacking off and smoking dope to it. It's a great record. There's only a handful of records that I've made that are great." The album was released by MGM on the Flick Disc label, but the group disbanded soon afterwards.

He is credited with being the inspiration behind promoter John Brower's call to John Lennon that resulted in the last-minute appearance of the Plastic Ono Band at the Toronto Rock and Roll Revival on September 13, 1969, where Fowley was the MC.  At this event, Fowley invited the audience to light matches and lighters to welcome a nervous John Lennon to the stage.

In 1969, Fowley produced the album I'm Back and I'm Proud for Gene Vincent. He co-wrote for Warren Zevon's first solo album, Wanted Dead or Alive. Fowley collaborated with his friend Skip Battin during Battin's membership as bassist with the Byrds on a number of songs which appeared on their early 1970's albums: "The Hungry Planet", "You All Look Alike", "Tunnel of Love", "Citizen Kane", "Absolute Happiness", "Precious Kate", and "America's Great National Pastime". The latter song was released as a single in late 1971. When Battin moved on to the New Riders of the Purple Sage in 1974, Fowley and Battin co-wrote five songs for the New Riders: "On the Amazon", "Big Wheels", "Singing Cowboy", "Neon Rose" and "Strangers on a Train".

1970s
In 1973, Fowley produced three recordings by Flash Cadillac & the Continental Kids for the film American Graffiti (1973). These songs were "At the Hop", "Louie Louie" and "She's So Fine". He co-wrote songs for KISS, Helen Reddy, Alice Cooper, Leon Russell and Kris Kristofferson. He made recordings with Jonathan Richman and the Modern Lovers, which were eventually released in 1981 as The Original Modern Lovers. Fowley's tracks were not included on the original versions of the album The Modern Lovers but some were included on later CD reissues.

In 1974, Fowley placed an advertisement in local fanzine Who Put the Bomp looking for female performers. He hoped to form an all-female group that he could produce and would perform his songs, but no one responded to the advert. In 1975, he met the teenage guitarist Joan Jett who expressed interest in forming an all-female band. Less than two weeks later, he met 15-year-old drummer Sandy West who introduced herself outside of the Rainbow Bar and Grill in Hollywood, California. West told Fowley of her aspirations to form an all-female band after playing in otherwise all-male groups. This meeting led to Fowley giving West Jett's phone number. The two met and began playing together at West's home the following week. A short time later Fowley recruited Lita Ford, Cherie Currie, and Jackie Fox. They eventually became the Runaways. While he did produce some of their albums and contributed lyrics to songs, the band was primarily responsible for creating their own music. The group severed their ties with Fowley in 1977.

Fowley co-wrote two Kiss songs "King of the Night Time World" and "Do You Love Me?" with Paul Stanley and producer Bob Ezrin. Both appeared on Kiss' 1976 album Destroyer.

In 1978, Fowley formed the Orchids, another all-female rock band, with Laurie McAllister, the last bassist from The Runaways, and Sandy Fury, a 13-year-old rock prodigy on rhythm guitar and vocals.

In 1979, Fowley signed new artists, such as Tommy Rock, the Popsicles, and the Orchids.  Fowley promoted "Kim Fowley Night" featuring these bands at the Whisky a Go Go. Fowley brought Stiv Bators & the Dead Boys, the Popsicles, and the Orchids into Leon Russell's Cherokee Recording Studio in Hollywood to record "LA, LA (I'm on a Hollywood High)".

1980s
In the 1980s Fowley moved to Australia where he announced that he was "looking for the new Beatles or ABBA". His search turned up power pop band Beathoven who were still under a recording contract with EMI. Changing their name to the Innocents, he secured a new record deal with Trafalgar Records and produced several songs for the group. They too became a cult band in later bootlegs/reissues. Fowley produced the first demos for the iconic power pop band, Candy, which featured Gilby Clarke and Kyle Vincent. Vincent was Fowley's personal assistant. Producer Fowley and attorney David Chatfield recorded the first album for Steel Breeze at Rusk studios in Hollywood and got Steel Breeze their recording contract with RCA. Casey Kasem, on the edition of March 12, 1983, of American Top 40, describes how Fowley discovered Steel Breeze while going through approximately 1200 demo tapes that were about to be discarded by a local Hollywood nightclub, Madame Wong's. "You Don't Want Me Anymore" was the first single from the band's self-titled album and quickly jumped into the Top 20 on the Billboard Hot 100 supported by a video that was a favorite of early MTV, and peaked at # 16. The next single, "Dreamin' Is Easy", also made it into the Top 40.

In 1984, still owning rights to the name "the Runaways", Fowley rebuilt the image around Gayle Welch, an unknown teenager from New Zealand. Adding Denise Prior, Missy Bonilla (then a typist for Denny Diante at what was CBS Records) and Cathy DiAmber (Catherine Dombrowski) with David Carr on keyboards, a Chicago guitarist Bill Millay and numerous session musicians. Fowley, assisted by New Zealander Glenn Holland, sought to cash in on the fame of the former Runaways members who had gone on to significant success in their individual solo careers. In 1985, he returned to the United States and recorded further songs with the Innocents' David Minchin.

In 1986, Fowley spotted the band Shanghai (consisting of Eric Leach and Taz Rudd of Symbol Six, Brent Muscat of Faster Pussycat, Patrick Muzingo, and Todd Muscat of Decry) at the Troubadour. After seeing their performance he asked, "Are you ready to make a record?!" They immediately moved in with Fowley and began writing and recording songs. David Libert, Alice Cooper's ex-road manager and agent for George Clinton and Parliament Funkadelic, was recruited to come in to handle the day-to-day babysitting chores. Shanghai played the reopening of the Whisky a Go Go in April 1986 with Guns N' Roses and Faster Pussycat. Their last show was at the Scream in Los Angeles in 1987.

2000s
Fowley is featured in Mayor of the Sunset Strip, a 2003 documentary about the disc jockey Rodney Bingenheimer.

Also in 2003, Fowley made a return trip to London, England, where he made an in-store appearance at Intoxica Records on Portobello Road and curated and performed an evening of music and entertainment at the Dirty Water Club at its then base at the Boston Music Room in North London.

Fowley became an experimental filmmaker after the DVD release of Mayor of the Sunset Strip. His written and directed works include: Black Room Doom, Dollboy: The Movie, Satan of Silverlake, The Golden Road to Nowhere, Frankenstein Goes Surfing, Trailer Park's On Fire and Jukebox California. Video clips/scenes from these movies can be seen on YouTube and Myspace, and feature a cast of regulars including but not limited to musical oddities such as the Fabulous Miss Wendy, Giddle Partridge, Richard Rogers (Crazy White Man) and Clown Porn Queen Hollie Stevens.

Fowley released the 21-track solo album Adventures in Dreamland on WEED/Innerstate Records in 2004. It contained the songs "Mayor of the Sunset Strip," "Terrors in Tinseltown," and "Ballad of Phil Spector."

In 2008, Fowley was reunited with Cherie Currie at Harry Houdini's mansion in Los Angeles. He played three dozen gigs between June 2007 and February 2009 as the act Crazy White Man, a duo featuring him on vocals and Richard Rogers on guitar. The bulk of the Crazy White Man shows took place during 2008 and included the Tribute to Gidget Gein, which raised funds for Gidget's Hollywood Forever memorial.

Capitol re-released several of his titles, and director Guy Ritchie used his song "The Trip" in the 2008 film RocknRolla. Fowley was regularly heard on Sirius Satellite Radio with a four-hour show on Saturdays and Sundays.

Currie wrote a memoir of her time in the Runaways, which was turned into the film, The Runaways, released on March 19, 2010. The film featured Michael Shannon as Fowley, alongside Kristen Stewart as Jett and Dakota Fanning as Currie.

In 2012, Fowley won the Special Jury Prize at the 13th Melbourne Underground Film Festival for his two feature projects – Golden Road to Nowhere and Black Room Doom.

2010s
In his last years, Fowley worked on writing and publishing his autobiography, which he divided between three distinct books. He released the first volume of his autobiography, Lord of Garbage, published by Kicks Books, in 2012. It covers the years 1939–1969 and describes his early childhood and beginning years in the music business. The second volume of his autobiography was intended to be called Planet Pain and to cover the years 1970–1994. The last volume was intended to be finished on his deathbed and to be released posthumously because, as the 2010s began, Fowley was terminally ill. On September 24, 2014, Fowley married longtime girlfriend and music executive Kara Wright-Fowley, in a private ceremony in Los Angeles.

Death 
Fowley died of bladder cancer in Hollywood, California on January 15, 2015, at the age of 75. He is interred at Hollywood Forever Cemetery.

Sexual misconduct allegations
In a 2001 interview, Michael Steele of The Bangles claimed Fowley fired her from The Runaways for refusing his sexual advances.

In July 2015, six months after Fowley's death, Jackie Fuchs (who had performed under the stage name Jackie Fox with The Runaways) claimed that Fowley had raped her in 1975 during a New Year's Eve party while he was involved with the band. Fox also alleged that Joan Jett and Cherie Currie witnessed the rape. Jett and Currie both denied seeing the incident, but songwriter Kari Krome, as well as other bystanders who did not intervene, have corroborated it. Look Away, a documentary about sexual abuse in the rock music industry features Fuchs' story.

Selected discography

Solo work
1967 Love Is Alive and Well
1968 Born to Be Wild
1968 Outrageous
1969 Good Clean Fun
1970 The Day the Earth Stood Still
1972 I'm Bad
1973 International Heroes
1974 Automatic
1975 Animal God of the Streets
1978 Living in the Streets
1978 Sunset Boulevard
1979 Snake Document Masquerade
1981 Son of Frankenstein
1984 Frankenstein and the All-Star Monster Band
1993 White Negroes in Deutschland
1994 Hotel Insomnia
1995 Bad News From The Underworld
1995 Mondo Hollywood
1995 Kings of Saturday Night (with Ben Vaughn)
1995 Let the Madness In
1996 Worm Culture
1997 Michigan Babylon
1997 Hidden Agenda at the 13th Note (with BMX Bandits)
1998 The Trip of a Lifetime
1999 Sex, Cars and God
2003 Fantasy World
2004 Strange Plantations
2004 Adventures in Dreamland
2013 Wildfire – The Complete Imperial Recordings 1968–69

Producer or writer
1959 The Renegades: "Charge b/w Geronimo"
1960 The Hollywood Argyles: "Alley Oop"
1961 Paul Revere and the Raiders: "Like Long Hair"
1962 B. Bumble and the Stingers: "Nut Rocker"
1963 The Murmaids: "Popsicles and Icicles"
1964 The Hellions (featuring Dave Mason & Jim Capaldi)
1965 Kim Fowley – "The Trip"
1966 Kim Fowley: "They're Coming to Take Me Away Ha-Haaa!"
1967 Elf Stone: "Louisiana Teardrops"
1967 The Fire Escape: Psychotic Reaction
1967 Soft Machine: "Feelin' Reelin Squeelin" (B-side of "Love Makes Sweet Music")
1967 The Seekers: "Emerald City"
1968 The Seeds: "Falling Off the Edge of My Mind" b/w Wild Blood
1968 St John Green - album
1969 Gene Vincent: I'm Back and I'm Proud!
1970 Wigwam: Tombstone Valentine
1971 Scorpion (Swedish Band) – Album
1972 The Modern Lovers: Some tracks included on 1981 album The Original Modern Lovers and on later CD reissues of The Modern Lovers
1973 American Graffiti Soundtrack – At the Hop, Louie Louie, & She's So Fine
1974 Wide World of Entertainment (ABC) – Music for Desi Arnaz, Jr. Special
1975 Blue Cheer: "America Nights" and "Fighting Star"
1975 Alice Cooper – Welcome to My Nightmare: "Escape"
1976 KISS - Destroyer: "King of the Night Time World" and "Do You Love Me?"
1976 The Runaways: The Runaways
1977 The Runaways: Queens of Noise
1977 The Runaways: Waitin' for the Night
1977 Helen Reddy: Ear Candy
1977 The Quick: Mondo Deco
1977 Vicky Leandros: Vicky Leandros
1977 Venus and the Razorblades: Songs from the Sunshine Jungle
1978 Dyan Diamond: In the Dark
1979 Vampires from Album Space: Album
1980 The Orchids: The Orchids
1981 Jon and the Nightriders California Fun (single - producer)
1981 Hollywood Confidential: Compilation (LP) and iTunes
1982 Steel Breeze: Steel Breeze
1986 London (band): Don't Cry Wolf (LP - producer)
1986 Child'ƨ Play: Ruff House [EP]
1987 Agent X – Rock n Roll Angels  (Demon Doll Records)
1988 Leather Nun: International Heroes
1996 Blowtorch - Automotivation (producer)
1999 Underground Animal: Compilation (LP and CD) Dionysus Records/Bacchus Archives
2003 Impossible but True – The Kim Fowley Story: Various artists (Ace Records)
2009 Kim Fowley – "Another Man's Gold"; "Lost Treasures from the Vaults 1959–69 Volume Two"
2011 – Next Year Fails : "Timaras Bitchn"
2011 With John York: "West Coast Revelation" (GRA Records)
2012 The Fabulous Miss Wendy: "No One Can Stop Me"
2014 Ariel Pink: pom pom

Bibliography

References

External links

 (archived 2013)

1939 births
2015 deaths
American male singer-songwriters
Singer-songwriters from California
Record producers from California
American music managers
University High School (Los Angeles) alumni
Alive Naturalsound Records artists
Deaths from bladder cancer
People with polio
Deaths from cancer in California
Burials at Hollywood Forever Cemetery
The Runaways
Capitol Records artists
The Hollywood Argyles members